The 2012 Cooper Tires British Formula 3 International Series season is the 62nd British Formula 3 International Series season. The series, promoted by the Stéphane Ratel Organisation, began on 6 April at Oulton Park and ended on 30 September at Donington Park after 29 races held at ten meetings.

The first two poles of the season were claimed at Oulton Park by second-year driver Jack Harvey for the Carlin team, and he won the opening race of the year ahead of teammates Jazeman Jaafar and Carlos Sainz Jr. In the reverse-grid second race, Fortec Motorsports' Pipo Derani scored his first win in the series, while teammate Félix Serrallés won the third race of the weekend in his first Formula Three meeting. A week later at Monza, Serralles and Sainz claimed their first poles in Formula Three. Rain before the start of the first race forced drivers to change from slick tyres, and in effect, the race started from the pit lane. Sainz, Jr. left pit lane first and won his first race in the championship. Derani and Jaafar, who had left the pits seventh and eighth respectively, joined Sainz, Jr. on the podium, while Serralles finished tenth. Serralles won the second race held in torrential rain, ahead of Harvey and teammate Pietro Fantin, while Sainz, Jr. comfortably won the third race, almost seventeen seconds clear of Serralles, with Serralles' teammate Alex Lynn taking his first podium in third place.

Regulation changes
In a change to the 2011 season, all races award championship points on the same points system. Previously, the second race had awarded points on a reduced scale – 10 points for the winner and decreasing by one point down to tenth place – compared to races one and three.

Drivers and teams
 For the Norisring event, drivers used different numbers in line with Formula 3 Euro Series regulations; each driver's Norisring race number is displayed in tooltips.

Driver changes
 Changed Teams
 Pipo Derani, who finished in fifteenth place in 2011, moved from Double R Racing to Fortec Motorsports.
 Pietro Fantin switched from Hitech Racing to Carlin.
 After a season with Fortec Motorsports, Fahmi Ilyas joined Double R Racing.
 Harry Tincknell changed teams for his second season in British F3 moving from Fortec Motorsports to Carlin.

 Entering/Re-Entering British Formula Three
 British Formula Ford racers Spike Goddard and Nick McBride moved into the championship with T-Sport. Fellow Formula Ford compatriot Geoff Uhrhane joined Double R Racing.
 Formula Renault UK champion Alex Lynn continued his collaboration with Fortec Motorsports for another season, moving into Formula Three. Félix Serrallés also continued his collaboration with Fortec Motorsports, moving from the Formula Renault Eurocup.
 JK Racing Asia Series driver Duvashen Padayachee graduated into the championship with Double R Racing.
 Formula Renault 2.0 NEC champion and Eurocup runner-up Carlos Sainz Jr. made his debut with Carlin.
 After finishing fifth in German Formula Three, Dutch driver Hannes van Asseldonk moved full-time to the British series with Fortec Motorsports. Van Asseldonk previously contested one round in 2011, as an invitational driver.

 Leaving British Formula Three
 Donington winner Valtteri Bottas left the series to concentrate on his Williams F1 reserve driver duties.
 António Félix da Costa joined Carlin in the GP3 Series.
 Mitch Evans, who participated in the final round with Double R Racing, remained in the GP3 Series with MW Arden.
 2011 runner-up Kevin Magnussen remained with Carlin, but moved into the Formula Renault 3.5 Series. Third-placed Carlos Huertas, seventh-placed Lucas Foresti and 26th-placed Yann Cunha also moved into the series for Fortec Motorsports, DAMS and Pons Racing respectively.
 2011 champion Felipe Nasr switched to DAMS for his GP2 Series debut.
 Scott Pye returned to his native Australia to compete in the Dunlop V8 Supercar Series, having finished in tenth place for Double R Racing.
 Alexander Sims, who won at Silverstone, switched to endurance racing as he joined Status Grand Prix to compete in the European Le Mans Series.
 Max Snegirev moved into the Auto GP World Series, with the Campos Racing team.

Race calendar and results
On 12 October 2011, it was revealed that the series was due to have three overseas rounds, at the Nürburgring, Spa-Francorchamps – both on the calendar in 2011 – and Pau. Pau returns to the series' schedule for the first time since 2006.

A provisional ten-round calendar was later announced on 7 November 2011, with the Nürburgring round removed, and rounds at Le Castellet and Monza, both of which held meetings in 2011, being restored to the calendar to make up four overseas rounds along with Spa-Francorchamps and Pau. All rounds were made up of three races except Pau, where only two races were held. On 21 April, it was announced that the series would add the Formula 3 Euro Series round at the Norisring in place of the round at Paul Ricard; the event would be held under Euro Series regulations. The rounds at Pau, Spa and the Norisring would be part of the revived FIA European Formula 3 Championship. The championship supported the British GT Championship at six rounds, two Blancpain Endurance Series events at Monza and Spa along with the Pau Grand Prix event and Formula 3 Euro Series event at Norisring.

Notes

Championship standings

References

External links
 The official website of the British Formula 3 Championship

British Formula Three Championship seasons
Formula Three season
British
British Formula 3 Championship